Gabriel Careaga Medina (15 June 1941  12 January 2004) was a sociologist, academic, and essayist. His fields of interest were politics and society in Mexico. He studied sociology at Universidad Nacional Autónoma de México (UNAM), and later earned a master's degree in economics at the College of Mexico. He was a professor on the faculty of Science, Politics, and Society at UNAM for three decades. He died of cancer at the age of 62.

Career
Medina edited Spanish-language periodicals, such as, El Universal, Revista de Bellas Artes, Revista Mexicana de Cultura, La Guía, Revista de revistas, La Cultura, and Uno más uno. His work in sociology followed three themes: intellectuals and their relationship to politics, economic development and modernization, and the middle class and urban life.

Works
Medina authored the following publications, all in Spanish:
 Biografía de un joven de la clase media
 Sociedad y teatro moderno en México
 Erotismo, violencia y política en el cine
 Estrellas de cine: los mitos del siglo XX
 Los espejismos del desarrollo: entre la utopía y el progreso
 Los intelectuales y la política en México
 Los intelectuales y el poder
 El siglo desgarrado
 Crisis de la razón y de la modernidad
 La ciudad emmascarada y Cuba, el fin de una utopía

Death
Medina died of cancer on 12 January 2004.

References
 
 

3. "Presencia de Gabriel Careaga": https://www.sdpnoticias.com/columnas/presencia-gabriel-careaga.html

People from Mexico City
2004 deaths
National Autonomous University of Mexico alumni
1941 births
Mexican sociologists